Major is a village in the Canadian province of Saskatchewan within the Rural Municipality of Prairiedale No. 321 and Census Division No. 13.

History 
Major incorporated as a village on September 29, 1914.

Demographics 

Notable people 
Major is the hometown of former NHL forward Laurie Boschman.

See also 
 List of communities in Saskatchewan
 Villages of Saskatchewan

Footnotes

Villages in Saskatchewan
Prairiedale No. 321, Saskatchewan
Division No. 13, Saskatchewan